Charles Emmanuel Hillam (6 October 1908 – 16 June 1958) was an English professional footballer who played as a goalkeeper in the Football League for Nelson, Burnley, Clapton Orient, Manchester United and Southend United.

Personal life 
During the early years of his football career, Hillam worked as a miner. After retiring from professional football, he worked as a policeman.

Career statistics

References

1908 births
1958 deaths
English footballers
Manchester United F.C. players
Clitheroe F.C. players
Leyton Orient F.C. players
Burnley F.C. players
Nelson F.C. players
Footballers from Burnley
Brentford F.C. wartime guest players
Association football goalkeepers
English Football League players
Southend United F.C. players
Chingford Town F.C. players

English miners
Deaths from lung cancer
British police officers